Gilla Pátraic mac Donnchada (died 996) was king of Osraige and the progenitor from whom all Mac Giolla Phádraigs (Fitzpatricks) of Ossory took their hereditary surname.  Gilla Pátraic succeeded his father Donnchad mac Cellaig in 976.  Donnchad mac Cellaig was the son of Cellach mac Cerbaill, king of Osraige (died c. 908) and his wife, Echrad ingen Matudán.  After a reign of 21 years, Gilla Pátraic was slain by Donnabhan, king of the Danes of Waterford, and Domhnall, king of the Desies.  By his wife, Maelmuire, he had five sons: (1) Donnchad mac Gilla Pátraic, king of Osraige and king of Leinster; (2) Dunghal (slain 1016); (3) Tadhg (blinded 1027); (4) Diarmaid (slain 1036); and, (5) Muircheartach (slain 1036).

References

External links
Fitzpatrick - Mac Giolla Phádraig Clan Society

FitzPatrick dynasty
996 deaths
10th-century Irish monarchs
Kings of Osraige